MURCS association (a variant of Mayer-Rokitansky-Küster-Hauser syndrome) is a very rare developmental disorder that primarily affects the reproductive and urinary systems involving MUllerian agenesis, Renal agenesis, Cervicothoracic Somite abnormalities. It affects only females.

Signs and symptoms

Genetics
Genetic heterogeneity is observed in MURCS association.

Diagnosis

 Abbreviations: FSH follicle stimulating hormone, LH luteinizing hormone, MRI magnetic resonance imaging, US ultrasonography
 aTransabdominal US should be considered in younger patients.

Treatment
Management of vaginal agenesis: correction of vaginal agenesis in MRKH syndrome with creation of a functional neovagina has been a hallmark in the treatment. Various different surgical and non-surgical methods have been suggested for vaginal construction.

Infertility and uterus transplantation (UTx): Uterus transplantation (UTx) has now emerged as the first true infertility treatment for women with MRKH syndrome and giving them full (gestational, genetic, legal) motherhood from start.

Notes

References
 
 
 
 Herlin, M.K., Petersen, M.B. & Brännström, M. Mayer-Rokitansky-Küster-Hauser (MRKH) syndrome: a comprehensive update. Orphanet J Rare Dis 15, 214 (2020). https://doi.org/10.1186/s13023-020-01491-9

External links 

Congenital disorders
Rare diseases
Congenital disorders of female genital organs
Syndromes affecting the kidneys